Baron Anatoly Sergeyevich Shteiger  (July 20, 1907  — October 24, 1944) was a Russian poet, one of the most significant poets of the first wave of emigration.

Biography
Descended from an old Swiss family. Father Sergei Shteiger (1868–1937), country leader, leader of the nobility of Kanevsky District, deputy to the IV
State Duma (1913).

He had two sisters, one of whom Alla (in Golovina marriage) was a poet known in Russian abroad. The family emigrated to Constantinople in 1920, later Shteiger lived in Czechoslovakia, France and (from 1931) Switzerland. During World War II he was passively involved in the Resistance, and wrote anti-Nazi pamphlets. The Nazi authorities in the areas bordering on Switzerland even appointed an award for his head.

Creation
An important literary and human document is the extensive correspondence of Shteiger and Marina Tsvetaeva (a personal meeting between them took place only once). Steiger is the addressee of Tsvetaeva's poetic cycle Poems to the Orphan (August–September 1936).

The author of collections of poems This Day  (1928),  This Life  (1931), Ingratitude  (1936); the final collection  Twice Two Four  was published posthumously (1950; under the same name, the most complete collection of poems in New York was published in 1981). He gained fame mainly as one of the representatives of the so-called  Paris Note, the literary movement in the poetry of the Russian Diaspora, which existed in the 1930s. The work of Steiger was promoted by the literary critic Georgy Adamovich spiritually close to him. In poetry, marked by the influence of Mikhail Kuzmin, Georgy Ivanov,   Adamovich, but at the same time deeply individual, lyrical miniature dominates (one or several stanzas, often with an additional super schematic last line), motives of loneliness, nostalgia, fragility the world, foreboding of death. In the metric, he mainly developed classical sizes, also used a 3-ic dolly.

Death
Since childhood, he was sick with severe tuberculosis, from which he died at the age of 37 years.

References

1907 births
1944 deaths
People from Kiev Governorate
People from the canton of Vaud
Russian male poets
20th-century Russian poets
20th-century Russian male writers
Russian people of Swiss descent
Soviet emigrants to France
Soviet emigrants to Czechoslovakia
Soviet emigrants to Switzerland
20th-century deaths from tuberculosis
Tuberculosis deaths in Switzerland
Barons